Franz Sales Meyer (9 December 1849 – 6 November 1927) was a German professor of ornament, author, poet and painter.

Life 
Franz Sales Meyer was born on 9 December 1849 in Kenzingen, Breisgau area. From 1866 to 1868, he attended the seminary in Meersburg, then moved to the Karlsruhe Polytechnic, where he completed his training in 1871 for industrial art teaching.  In 1873, he accepted to the faculty of the Grand Ducal School of Applied Arts in Karlsruhe and, in 1878, he was appointed as a teacher. After a short illness, Franz Sales Meyer died on 6 November 1927 in Karlsruhe.

Awards 
1915 Honorary Citizen of the town of Meersburg 
1915 Honorary Citizen of the city Kenzingen

Bibliography

References

External links 

1849 births
1927 deaths
German male writers